The Victoria stonebasher (Marcusenius victoriae) is a species of ray-finned fish in the family Mormyridae. It is found in Kenya, Rwanda, Tanzania, and Uganda. Its natural habitats are rivers, swamps, freshwater lakes, freshwater marshes, and inland deltas. It is threatened by habitat loss.

Etymology
The fish was not named after Queen Victoria but for Lake Victoria, from where the fish is found.

References

Marcusenius
Taxonomy articles created by Polbot
Fish described in 1929
Taxa named by E. Barton Worthington